Allan Barry Stone (1932-2006) was an American art dealer, gallerist and collector. He was the founder of Allan Stone Gallery (later known as Allan Stone Projects), which showcased contemporary art for over five decades.

Early life and education 
Allan Stone was born in Manhattan in 1932. His father was a lawyer and his mother was the daughter of Sam Klein, the founder of New York City-based discount dress store chain S. Klein on the Square. Stone attended Phillips Academy in Andover, Massachusetts, Harvard University, and studied law at Boston University.

He practiced law at the U.S. Department of Justice in Washington D.C. and then on Wall Street in New York City where he began giving legal advice to artists for free or in exchange for their work. His clients included Robert Mallary, John Chamberlain, and Elaine de Kooning. During this time, he joined the Anonymous Art Reclamation Society which was founded by art dealer Ivan Karp.

Allan Stone Gallery 
In 1960, Stone founded the Allan Stone Gallery on 86th and Madison in New York City. During its first decade, the gallery showcased contemporary artists including established Abstract Expressionists Arshile Gorky, Franz Kline, Willem de Kooning, Alfred Leslie, and Barnett Newman, along with sculptors Cesar and John Chamberlain.

In addition to showing already well-known artists, the gallery exhibited nearly one-hundred and fifty emerging artists during the next five decades. This included first or early New York for Arman, Robert Arneson, Richard Estes, Dorothy Grebenack, Eva Hesse, Robert Ryman, Wayne Thiebaud, and Jack Whitten.

Stone's 1962 solo show of Thiebaud's work is widely credited with launching the artist's career. The show resulted in a favorable New York Times review and private sales, including a purchase by a curator from the Metropolitan Museum of Art.

Records from the Allan Stone Gallery reside in the Archives of American Art.

Personal life 
Allan Stone was married twice, first to Marguerite Cullman with whom he had four daughters and later to Clare Chester with whom he had two more daughters.

Stone was widely considered to be an expert on Abstract Expressionism. He was interviewed for the 2006 film, Who the #$&% is Jackson Pollock. He was also widely known for his large collection of art and other objects, including furniture and cars. At the time of his death, the New York Times noted that he had the largest collection of African and Oceanic art in private hands.

He died in his sleep from heart failure at his home in Westchester County, New York in 2006. In 2007, he was the subject of a film about his life produced by his daughter Olympia Stone entitled The Collector: Allan Stone’s Life in Art.

References 

1932 births
2006 deaths